National Highway 444A is a national highway entirely in the state of Haryana in India.  NH 444A is a secondary route of National Highway 44.

Route 
Ambala - Saha - Shahabad.

Junctions  

  Terminal near Ambala.
  near Saha.
  Terminal near Sahabad.

See also 

 List of National Highways in India
 List of National Highways in India by state

References

External links 

 NH 444A on OpenStreetMap

National highways in India
National Highways in Haryana